Olivier Beer (born 18 October 1990) is a Swiss professional racing cyclist. He rode at the 2015 UCI Track Cycling World Championships.

References

External links

1990 births
Living people
Swiss male cyclists
Sportspeople from Lausanne
Olympic cyclists of Switzerland
Cyclists at the 2016 Summer Olympics
Swiss track cyclists